Śniadowo  is a village in Łomża County, Podlaskie Voivodeship, in north-eastern Poland. It is the seat of the gmina (administrative district) called Gmina Śniadowo.

The village has a population of 1,500 people. Until the late 1980s, it used to be a local railroad junction, located along the Ostrołęka - Lapy line. In Śniadowo, a 15-kilometer connection to Łomża stemmed. All these lines are now closed.

References

Villages in Łomża County
Łomża Governorate
Białystok Voivodeship (1919–1939)
Warsaw Voivodeship (1919–1939)
Belastok Region